Disu is a surname. Notable people with the surname include: 

Abdul Karim Disu (1912–2000), Nigerian journalist
Adiat Disu (born 1987), American businesswoman
Bella Disu (born 1986), Nigerian businesswoman
Dylan Disu (born 2000), American basketball player